Kronet Til Konge (Norwegian for "Crowned To Be King") is the debut studio album by Norwegian black metal band Dødheimsgard. It was released in 1995, through Malicious Records. Kronet Til Konge was re-released in 1999 on Century Media Records.

Track listing 

 "Intro" – 0:59
 "Å Slakte Gud" ("To Slaughter God") – 6:09
 "En Krig å Seire" ("A War to Win") – 4:58
 "Jesu Blod" ("Jesus' Blood") – 4:51
 "Midnattskogens sorte kjerne" ("The Black Core of the Midnightforest") – 6:47
 "Kuldeblest Over Evig Isøde" – 4:13
 "Kronet til konge" ("Crowned to Be King") – 4:35
 "Mournful, Yet and Forever" – 7:05
 "Når Vi Har Dolket Guds Hjerte" ("When We Have Stabbed God's Heart") – 4:47
 "Starcave, Depths and Chained" – 3:41
 "When Heavens End" – 5:18
 "Outro" – 0:42

Critical reception 

Steve Huey of AllMusic said, "Dødheimsgard have the basic Norwegian black metal style down pat, even if they don't really add anything new to the genre".

Personnel 

 Aldrahn – vocals, guitar
 Vicotnik – drums
 Fenriz – bass guitar, synthesizer

References 

Dødheimsgard albums
1995 debut albums